Buticulotrema thermichthysi is a species of trematodes inhabiting hydrothermal vent fishes (particularly Thermichthys hollisi) in the south eastern Pacific Ocean. It can be distinguished from its family by its symmetrical testicular configuration; its uterus passing between the testes. Furthermore, it can be differentiated from its cogenerate species by its long and strongly muscular oesophagus, that bifurcates dorsally to the posterior part of the animal's ventral sucker; its long and narrow pars prostatica and distal male duct, as well as its sinistral genital pore that can be found at the level of its pharynx.

References

Further reading
Bray, Rodney A., et al. "The molecular phylogeny of the digenean family Opecoelidae Ozaki, 1925 and the value of morphological characters, with the erection of a new subfamily." Folia Parasitologica 63 (2016): 013.
Shedko, M. B., S. G. Sokolov, and D. M. Atopkin. "The first record of Dimerosaccus oncorhynchi (Trematoda: Opecoelidae) in fishes from rivers of Primorsky Territory, Russia, with a discussion on its taxonomic position using morphological and molecular data." ПАРАЗИТОЛОГИЯ 49 (2015): 3.

Plagiorchiida
Parasitic helminths of fish
Animals described in 2014
Fauna of the Pacific Ocean